The Amina Profile (French: Le profil Amina) is a Canadian documentary film directed by Sophie Deraspe and coproduced by Esperamos and the National Film Board of Canada, which premiered at the 2015 Sundance Film Festival in the World Cinema category. It was pitched at Sheffield Doc/Fest's MeetMarket in 2014. The film was retitled A Gay Girl in Damascus: The Amina Profile by its U.S. distributor IFC for the theatrical release and for subsequent film festival screenings.

Synopsis
The film centres on Sandra Bagaria, a Montreal woman who was in an online relationship with star blogger Amina Abdallah Arraf al Omari. Bagaria became involved in the international attempt to rescue Arraf after her purported abduction by the Syrian regime.

Reception 
Under its French title, Le profil Amina, the film was named Best Documentary:Society at the 2016 Prix Gémeaux, honouring the best in francophone Canadian television.

The film received Canadian Screen Award nominations for Best Feature Length Documentary and Best Editing in a Documentary at the 4th Canadian Screen Awards.

It was shortlisted for the Prix collégial du cinéma québécois in 2016.

See also
List of lesbian, gay, bisexual or transgender-related films of 2015
 List of LGBT films directed by women

References

External links

2015 films
Canadian documentary films
Canadian LGBT-related films
Documentary films about LGBT and Islam
2015 LGBT-related films
Documentary films about the Internet
National Film Board of Canada documentaries
Films directed by Sophie Deraspe
Documentary films about lesbians
English-language Canadian films
French-language Canadian films
Arabic-language Canadian films
2010s Canadian films